Rickard Göransson is a Swedish songwriter, producer, and musician. He was the lead guitarist for American alternative rock band Carolina Liar. He has written and produced for artists including Ariana Grande, Jessie J, Nicki Minaj, Avril Lavigne, Ellie Goulding, Enrique Iglesias, Nick Jonas, Charlie Puth, and Selena Gomez.

Göransson's songwriting credits include eight-times-platinum "Bang Bang", two-times-platinum "God Is a Woman", and "Husavik" (from the 2020 film Eurovision Song Contest: The Story of Fire Saga), which won the Society of Composers and Lyricists' Outstanding Original Song for Visual Media in 2021.

Personal life

Born and raised in Växjö, Sweden, he attended the Stockholm Conservatory of Music. He is based in Los Angeles, California.

Career

Carolina Liar 
Rickard joined the band Carolina Liar in 2007. The band is best known for the songs "I'm Not Over" and "Show Me What I'm Looking For" from their 2008 major-label debut album, Coming to Terms, produced by Swedish producers Max Martin and Tobias Karlsson. The band was the supporting act on the David Cook/Gavin Degraw 2011 Fall Tour. In 2012, they were the opening act for the Kelly Clarkson/The Fray Tour. They also played as the opening act for Rob Thomas on his Thomas Cradlesong Tour in 2009–2010.

Songwriting and producing 

In 2014 Rickard gained prominence with the release of the hit "Bang Bang" (Ariana Grande, Jessie J, and Nicki Minaj)), which he co-wrote and co-produced. The song peaked at number 3 on the US Billboard Hot 100, debuted at number 1 in the UK, and has amassed 1.6 billion YouTube streams and nearly 900 million Spotify plays.

Rickard is signed to MXM Music Publishing and continues to write and produce for various artists. During 2015-2017 he produced and wrote the leadoff track on Flo Rida's EP My House (EP)), co-wrote Ellie Goulding's track Still Falling for You from the soundtrack to the film Bridget Jones's Baby, co-wrote "Bills" by LunchMoney Lewis, and co-wrote and co-produced "Nobody Love," Tori Kelly's first entry on the US Billboard Hot 100. His co-writes included Nick Jonas's "Under You" and Tove Lo's "Don't Talk About It." In 2018 he co-wrote and co-produced "Empty Cups" from Charlie Puth's Voicenotes album. His biggest hit of this period was his co-write of Ariana Grande's double-platinum "God Is a Woman" in 2018.

Further major success came in 2020 with his co-write and co-production of "Husavik" for the 2020 film Eurovision Song Contest: The Story of Fire Saga.  The song won the Outstanding Original Song for Visual Media award from the Society of Composers and Lyricists, received a nomination for the Best Song at the 26th Critics' Choice Awards, and was included in the February 2021 shortlist for the Academy Award for Best Original Song at the 93rd Academy Awards. The song reached #6 on the British iTunes chart and #9 in the US.

Awards and nominations 

 "God Is a Woman", Winner, ASCAP POP Music Award for Most Performed Songs in 2018 (2019)
 "Bang Bang", Winner, ASCAP POP Music Award for Most Performed Songs in 2014 (2015)
 "Husavik (My Hometown)"
 Winner, Society of Composers and Lyricists, Outstanding Original Song for Visual Media, 2020 (2021)
 Winner, New Mexico Film Critics Award, Best Original Song, 2020 (2021)
 Winner, Hollywood Critics Association, Best Original Song, 2020 (2021)
 Nominee, Academy Award for Best Original Song, 2020 (2021)
 Nominee, Critics Choice Awards for Best Original Song, 2020 (2021)
 Nominee, Music City Film Critics' Association Awards, Best Song, 2020 (2021)
 Nominee, International Online Cinema Awards (INOCA), Best Original Song, 2020 (2021)
 Nominee, Hollywood Music In Media Awards (HMMA), Best Original Song – Feature Film, 2020 (2021)
 Nominee, Chicago Indie Critics Awards (CIC), Best Original Song, 2020 (2021)

Discography

References

Swedish songwriters
Swedish record producers
Swedish male musicians
1983 births
Living people
People from Växjö